Nikolaos Fokianos (born 18 April 1965) is a Greek swimmer. He competed in three events at the 1988 Summer Olympics.

References

1965 births
Living people
Greek male swimmers
Olympic swimmers of Greece
Swimmers at the 1988 Summer Olympics
Place of birth missing (living people)